Richard Haynes (27 August 1913 – 16 October 1976) was an English cricketer. He played for Gloucestershire between 1930 and 1939.

References

External links

1913 births
1976 deaths
English cricketers
Gloucestershire cricketers
People from Shipston-on-Stour
Oxfordshire cricketers